Großschönau is a town in the district of Gmünd in the Austrian state of Lower Austria. It is the home of the Sonnenwelt children's science park.

Geography
Großschönau lies in the western Waldviertel in Lower Austria. About 37.01 percent of the municipality is forested.

References

External links
Municipal website
Sonnenwelt children's science park

Cities and towns in Gmünd District